Paris-Trousseau syndrome (PTS) is an inherited disorder characterized by mild hemorrhagic tendency associated with 11q chromosome deletion. It manifests as a granular defect within an individual's platelets. It is characterized by thrombocytes with defects in α-granule components which affects the cell's surface area and, consequently, its ability to spread when necessary.

FLI1 has been suggested as a candidate.

See also 
 Jacobsen syndrome

References

External links 

Genetic disorders with OMIM but no gene
Syndromes